Raven & Kreyn is a French electronic music duo of disc jockeys and producers. Consisting of Alexandre Abescat and Tom Mokrane, Raven & Kreyn started in 2013. The duo signed on notable labels such as Spinnin' Records, Armada Music, Universal Music, Warner Music, Atlantic Records, Big Beat Records, Ministry Of Sound Australia, Hexagon and NoCopyrightSounds.

They are mostly known for their NoCopyrightSounds singles, for example So Happy which reached over 10 million views on YouTube, In The Air which reached over 5 million, Bubble 5 million, Rich 5 million, and others such as Call Me Again, Get This Party, and Sing For You which reached over 8 million on Spotify. They now count more than 200 millions streams.

However, Raven & Kreyn appeared several times in the international Beatport Top 100 best selling chart, in particular with their single Back To The Future which reached the 5th place, Bam Bam (with Laidback Luke) as 4th, Nobody Else (with RetroVision) 2nd, Rock Now at the 29th place, Long Game 30th place, Chicago 32th. and even more recently.

These young disc jockeys were played and supported numerous times by David Guetta, Avicii, Tiësto, Martin Garrix, Alan Walker, Dimitri Vegas & Like Mike, Afrojack, Laidback Luke, Bingo Players, and many other artists from the electronic dance music scene.

They debuted radio broadcasting in 2018, with DJ sets on the national French radio Fun Radio.

In 2019, they went for the first time at Tomorrowland, together with Don Diablo.

In 2020, they were ranked as 19th Best producers in the world according to 1001tracklists Top 101, becoming one of the highest entry of all time.

They previously ranked as 110th in 2019.

Musical career 
Raven & Kreyn first caught the public's attention with their 2015 bounce anthem "Rave It". After the track charted as 19th in the Beatport Top 100 it didn't take long until the EDM industry discovered their sound. Taking a step in the Bass House scene, they released "Long Game" and "Rock Now" the following year, two tracks that pushed the duo's imprint forward, and gathered a surprising amount of support from the [electronic dance music scene.

In 2016, Raven & Kreyn released their first track on Don Diablo's Hexagon label, a collaboration with Steff Da Campo called "Chicago".  The duo's aggressive sound that made the success of Rock Now quickly resonated in DJ sets all around the world, continuing to build the hype around the french act.

Although, 2017 has seen the duo grow very quickly with multiple releases on Hexagon, Armada Music, and NoCopyrightSounds. Tracks such as So Happy, In The Air, Call Me Again had made the duo popular on YouTube, Spotify, and SoundCloud. The release of Nobody Else, a collaboration with french producer RetroVision took place the same year. It was heard all around the globe, and gathered an enormous number of supports from music industry leaders. Featuring vocal samples from Loleatta Holloway's Love Sensation, the track is a crossover between old-school breakdowns and Future House. It became Raven & Kreyn most industry-supported track up to this day,  and one of the most DJ-played tracks of 2017.

The duo ended 2017 with an official remix of Galantis & Throttle song Tell Me You Love Me.

In 2018, Raven & Kreyn teamed-up with Maxim Schunk to revisit Destiny's Child's 90s classic Say My Name, featuring vocals by BISHØP.

The French DJs released Bubble, Biscuit and Muffin on NoCopyrightSounds a few months later, three songs that confirmed their new futuristic approach of House music. Apart from the YouTube and SoundCloud community, the duo had imposed itself with numerous Spinnin Records releases.

Raven & Kreyn also released an official remix for Joe Jonas band DNCE and Italian DJs Merk & Kremont the same year.

Ranking top 101 best producers in the world  
2019: #110º
2020: #19º

Discography

Singles

Remixes

References

External links
 
 
 Raven & Kreyn on Beatport

French DJs
French house musicians
Electronic music duos
Electro house musicians
French musical duos
Musical groups established in 2013
Electronic dance music DJs
NoCopyrightSounds artists
Spinnin' Records artists
Armada Music artists